The Catalonia national amateur football team is the official amateur football team of Catalonia. It is controlled by the Catalan Football Federation.

History

Composition
The team is composed of players who play in the Tercera División Group 5 and regional lower divisions - all operated autonomously within Catalonia but under the pyramid of the Spanish football league system - with eligibility criteria being club (must play for a club in the territory), age (must be between 18 and 35) and amateur status (must never have signed a contract as a professional).

Participation in competitions
The team plays in the biennial UEFA Regions' Cup and they were runners-up in the overall pan-European tournament in 2013, having won the preceding Spanish qualifying tournament in 2011–12. The Catalans retained the national stage title (where they compete against equivalent teams from each of the autonomous communities of Spain) in 2013–14, but did not progress from their intermediate group in the subsequent 2015 UEFA Regions' Cup.

Matches
Catalonia score listed first in all matches.

Results summary

Head-to-head against other Autonomous Communities

See also
Catalonia national football team (professional)

References

External links
Catalonia Football Federation

Sports organizations established in 1999
1999 establishments in Catalonia
European national amateur association football teams
Spanish stage of the UEFA Regions' Cup
Football in Catalonia